Son,  Sohn or Shon (孫, 손) is a common Korean family name. It is a transliteration of the Chinese surname Sun. 

There are two clans of "Son", "Sohn", "Sun".  One in "Kwang Ju", and the other in the "Kyung Sahng" region. 
The clan originated from the "Mi-ryang Park" clan.

As of 2000, there were 415,182 people by this surname in South Korea.

List of notable people with this name
Sohn Kee-chung (1912–2002), South Korean athlete and first ethnic Korean to win a medal at the Olympic Games
Peter Sohn (born 1977), American animator, director, voice actor, and storyboard artist
Shon Seung-mo (born 1980), South Korean badminton player
Sohn Won-yil (1909–1980), admiral, founded the South Korean navy
Son Byeong-hui (1861–1922), Korean nationalist, activist for independence from Japan
Son Dam Bi (born 1983), South Korean singer and actress 
Son Dong-woon (born 1991), South Korean singer and member of boy band Highlight
Son Chae-young (born 1999), South Korean singer and member of girl group Twice
Son Eun-seo (born 1986), South Korean actress
Son Ga-in (born 1987), South Korean singer and actress, member of girl group Brown Eyed Girls
Son Hak-gyu (born 1947), South Korean politician, former governor of Gyeonggi-do
Son Heung-min (born 1992), South Korean professional footballer
Son Ho-young (born 1980), Korean-American singer, member of boy band g.o.d
Son Hyun-joo (born 1965), South Korean actor
Masayoshi Son (born 1957), Japanese-Korean businessman, founder of Softbank and chairman of Sprint Corporation
Son Na-eun (born 1994), South Korean singer and member of girl group Apink
Son Suk-ku (born 1983), South Korean actor, director, and screenwriter
Wendy (born Son Seung-wan, 1994), South Korean singer and member of girl group Red Velvet
Son Seung-won (born 1990), South Korean actor
Son Seung-yeon (born 1993), South Korean singer, winner of The Voice of Korea season 1
Sue Son (born 1985), South Korean classical and crossover violinist
Son Ye-jin (born 1982), South Korean actress
Son Yeon-jae (born 1994), South Korean rhythmic gymnast
Son Yong-chan (born 1991), South Korean footballer
Son Young-hee (born 1993), South Korean Olympic weightlifter
Shownu (born Son Hyun-woo, 1992), South Korean singer and member of boy band Monsta X

See also
Korean name
List of Korean family names
List of people of Korean descent
Sun (surname)

References

Korean-language surnames
Son clans

vi:Tôn (họ)